Michael W. Burns (born February 16, 1958) is an American legislator who served as a member of the Maryland House of Delegates for District 32, which covers a portion of Anne Arundel County, Maryland.

Background
In 1994, Michael Burns won election as one of the three delegates for District 32 in the Maryland House of Delegates. In that year, only one of the incumbents ran, one Victor A. Sulin, who was defeated. The other two incumbents, Patrick C. Scannello and Theodore J. Sophocleus did not run again. (Sophecleus had replaced a previous delegate, Tyras S. Athey, when he resigned to become Secretary of State of Maryland).

In 1998, Michael Burns ran for reelection, and was defeated. Democrat Mary Ann Love and Republican James E. Rzepkowski were both reelected, but Sophecleus finally ran for election and won.

Education
Burns graduated from Towson State University in 1980 as magna cum laude with a B.S. in History.  He returned to college, this time to the University of Maryland School of Law, graduating with his J.D. with honors in 1983.

Career
After being admitted to the Maryland Bar in 1983, Burns began to work as a law clerk in the Baltimore City Circuit Court, where he worked until 1984.

In 1987, Burns was the Maryland Executive Director for the campaign of Senator Robert Dole for President.  After the election he became the Executive Director for the Maryland Republican Party. Burns was a delegate to the Republican Party National Convention in 1988 and again in 1996.

Maryland Governor Robert Ehrlich appointed Burns to the Chair of the Maryland State Board of Contract Appeals in 2003, which Burns will hold for 5 years, until 2009.

Election results
1998 Race for Maryland House of Delegates – District 32
Voters to choose three:
{| class="wikitable"
|-
!Name
!Votes
!Percent
!Outcome
|-
|-
|Mary Ann Love, Dem.
|15,823
|  19%
|   Won
|-
|-
|Theodore Sophocleus, Dem.
|15,382
|  18%
|   Won
|-
|-
|James E. Rzepkowski, Rep.
|14,959
|  18%
|   Won
|-
|-
|Michael W. Burns, Rep.
|13,247
|  16%
|   Lost
|-
|-
|Victor Sulin, Dem.
|12,658
|  15%
|   Lost
|-
|-
|Betty Ann O'Neill, Dem.
|11,752
|  14%
|   Lost
|-
|}

1994 Race for Maryland House of Delegates – District 32
Voters to choose three:
{| class="wikitable"
|-
!Name
!Votes
!Percent
!Outcome
|-
|-
|James E. Rzepkowski, Rep.
|15,147
|  20%
|   Won
|-
|-
|Michael W. Burns, Rep.
|12,883
|  17%
|   Won
|-
|-
|Mary Ann Love, Dem.
|12,414
|  16%
|   Won
|-
|-
|Gerald P. Starr, Rep.
|12,166
|  16%
|   Lost
|-
|-
|Victor A. Sulin, Dem.
|11,872
|  16%
|   Lost
|-
|-
|Thomas H. Dixon III, Dem.
|11,002
|  15%
|   Lost
|-
|}

References

External links
 Maryland House of Delegates: Michael W. Burns

1958 births
Living people
Republican Party members of the Maryland House of Delegates
People from Anne Arundel County, Maryland
Politicians from Baltimore
Towson University alumni
University of Maryland Francis King Carey School of Law alumni